Emilie Viqueira (born March 21, 1969) is a Puerto Rican former professional tennis player.

Biography
Viqueira, who comes from Mayagüez, began competing on the professional tour in the late 1980s. She featured mostly on the ITF circuit, winning six titles in doubles. All of her WTA Tour main draw appearances came at her home tournament, the Puerto Rico Open.

During her career she played college tennis for UC Berkeley, where she earned All-American honors in 1990 and 1991.

At representative level, Viqueira was a mixed doubles bronze medalist at the 1991 Pan American Games in Havana and represented the Puerto Rico Fed Cup team in 16 ties from 1992 to 1997.

She is married to Puerto Rican musician Roy Brown.

ITF finals

Doubles (6–4)

References

External links
 
 
 

1969 births
Living people
Puerto Rican female tennis players
California Golden Bears women's tennis players
Tennis players at the 1991 Pan American Games
Pan American Games bronze medalists for Puerto Rico
Pan American Games medalists in tennis
People from Mayagüez, Puerto Rico
Central American and Caribbean Games silver medalists for Puerto Rico
Central American and Caribbean Games bronze medalists for Puerto Rico
Central American and Caribbean Games medalists in tennis
Tennis players at the 1987 Pan American Games
Medalists at the 1991 Pan American Games
20th-century Puerto Rican women